"Casanova" is a 1987 single by American R&B vocal group LeVert, written and produced by Reggie Calloway. It reached number five on the Billboard Hot 100 singles chart and number nine on the UK Singles Chart, LeVert's only Top Ten (and Top-40) on either chart. It was the first new jack swing song to reach number one on the Billboard Hot Black Singles chart. It topped the chart for two weeks, becoming the group's second number-one. It has become a standard number for New Orleans brass bands following its popularization by the Rebirth Brass Band. The song is featured in 1987's The Pick-Up Artist, starring Robert Downey Jr. and Molly Ringwald, and appears on the soundtrack album of the Whoopi Goldberg movie Fatal Beauty, released the same year.

Charts

Weekly charts

Year-end charts

Ultimate Kaos version

British boy band Ultimate Kaos released a cover of "Casanova" as the lead single from their second album, The Kaos Theory, in February 1997. It reached the top 10 in Belgium, France, and the Netherlands. On June 1, 1998, it was re-released and entered the top 20 in Australia.

Track listing
CD maxi
 "Casanova" (7-inch mix)
 "Casanova" (7-inch club mix)
 "Casanova" (C&J R&B mix)
 "Who's Got the Flavour"

Charts

Weekly charts

Year-end charts

Certifications

References
 

1987 singles
1997 singles
Atlantic Records singles
LeVert songs
Mercury Records singles
New jack swing songs
Polydor Records singles
Songs written by Reggie Calloway
Ultimate Kaos songs